The title of French flat racing Champion Jockey is awarded to the jockey who rides most flat winners in France. The championship used to run the whole calendar year, but since 2022, it runs from 1st March to 31st October. The change was made to revive the competition and make it more appealing to younger jockeys. The name of the awards in French is Cravache d'Or (Golden Whip) for the winner, Cravache d'Argent (Silver Whip) for the runner-up and Cravache de Bronze (Bronze Whip) for the third jockey.

Flat racing Cravache d'Or classification

Most successful jockeys
 Yves Saint-Martin - 15 wins
 Christophe Soumillon - 10 wins
 Freddy Head - 6 wins
 Cash Asmussen - 5 wins

See also
 British flat racing Champion Jockey
 Irish flat racing Champion Jockey
 United States Champion Jockey by wins
 United States Champion Jockey by earnings

References 

French jockeys